Eitzen may refer to:

Places
Eitzen, Minnesota

Companies
Eitzen Group
Eitzen Chemical
Eitzen Gas
Eitzen Maritime Services

People
Axel Camillo Eitzen (1851–1937), Norwegian founder of the Eitzen Group
Axel Camillo Eitzen (1883–1968), Norwegian inheritor of the Eitzen Group
Johan Eitzen (1893–), Norwegian businessman in Uruguay